The Horseranch Range is a  long north–south trending mountain range in northern British Columbia, Canada, located at the head of the Red River to the northwest of Deadwood Lake. Part of the Dease Plateau of either the Yukon Plateau or Cassiar Mountains system, it contains no glaciers and lies completely above tree line.

See also
Liard Plain
Interior Mountains

References

Horseranch Range in the Canadian Mountain Encyclopedia

Cassiar Mountains